Elaeocyma empyrosia is a species of sea snail, a marine gastropod mollusk in the family Drilliidae.

Description
The shell grows to a length of 31 mm.

(Original description) The solid shell has a high acute spire and a polished surface. Its color is yellowish with a burnt sienna brown tint on the later whorls.  A paler peripheral band develops white patches where it crosses the ribs. The transverse sculpture consists of (about 11) slightly oblique somewhat flexuous ribs, obsolete below the periphery and upon the anal fasciole, the sharpest on the earlier whorls. The spiral sculpture consists of coarse, sometimes nearly obsolete threads, most obvious below the periphery. The shell contains 9 whorls (the nucleus lost in the specimen). The aperture is short, wide, with a deep wide notch leaving a wide fasciole, a callous lump above the notch on the body, and a rather strong whitish callus, externally brown-edged, on the columella. The siphonal notch is wide with a marked fasciole. The siphonal canal is slightly recurved.

Distribution
This species occurs in the Eastern Pacific off California.

References

  Tucker, J.K. 2004 Catalog of recent and fossil turrids (Mollusca: Gastropoda). Zootaxa 682:1–1295
 Turgeon, D.; Quinn, J.F.; Bogan, A.E.; Coan, E.V.; Hochberg, F.G.; Lyons, W.G.; Mikkelsen, P.M.; Neves, R.J.; Roper, C.F.E.; Rosenberg, G.; Roth, B.; Scheltema, A.; Thompson, F.G.; Vecchione, M.; Williams, J.D. (1998). Common and scientific names of aquatic invertebrates from the United States and Canada: mollusks. 2nd ed. American Fisheries Society Special Publication, 26. American Fisheries Society: Bethesda, MD (USA). . IX, 526 + cd-rom pp.

External links
 

empyrosia
Gastropods described in 1899